"Always and Ever" is a song by Australian pop-rock band Southern Sons. It was released in November 1990 as the second single taken from their debut studio album, Southern Sons (1990). The song peaked at number 16 in Australia.

Track listing
CD single  (105182)

Weekly charts

References

External links
 "Always and Ever" by Southern Sons at Discogs

1990 songs
1990 singles
Southern Sons songs
RCA Records singles
Songs written by Phil Buckle